The World Allround Speed Skating Championships for Men took place on 12 and 13 February 1983 in Oslo at the Bislett Stadion ice rink.

Title holder was the Netherlander Hilbert van der Duim.

Prior to 1986, it was possible to win the world championships by winning 3 of the 4 distances. This is why Rolf Falk-Larssen became champion even though he had a higher samalog total than Tomas Gustafson.

Classification

Source:

References

Attribution
In Dutch

World Allround Speed Skating Championships, 1983
1983 World Allround